The Jersey Mike’s Classic is a three-day round-robin men's college basketball tournament held the weekend prior to Thanksgiving at the McArthur Center on the campus of Eckerd College in St. Petersburg, Florida. The tournament focuses strictly on mid-major National Collegiate Athletic Association (NCAA) basketball programs, giving them an opportunity for good-quality non-conference match-ups on a neutral floor in a prime location.

The Jersey Mike's Classic was founded in 2021, when the 2021 Jamaica Classic tournament was cancelled due to the COVID-19 pandemic and the competition planned for the 2021 Jamaica Classic was shifted to the new Jersey Mike's Classic.

Brackets 
* – Denotes overtime period

2021 Participants and Brackets 
 Ball State
 FIU
 Green Bay
 UMass
 UNC Greensboro
 Weber State

References

External links
Official site of the Jersey Mike's Classic

College men's basketball competitions in the United States
College basketball competitions
2021 establishments in Florida
Recurring sporting events established in 2021
Sports in St. Petersburg, Florida
Basketball competitions in Florida